Walkin' & Talkin' is an album by American trombonist Bennie Green, recorded in 1959 and released on the Blue Note label. It was issued on CD only in Japan, in 2004.

Reception

The AllMusic review by Stephen Thomas Erlewine awarded the album 4 stars and stated: "All of Bennie Green's Blue Note records were rich with joyously swinging blues and bop, highlighted by his warm, friendly tone and good humor. Walkin' & Talkin' , his third record for the label, was no exception to the rule... The result is no different from Green's two previous Blue Note records, but it's no less satisfying, and fans of swinging bop should be contented with Walkin' & Talkin'''."

Track listingAll compositions by Gildo Mahones, except as indicated.''

 "The Shouter" - 4:01
 "Green Leaves" - 5:45
 "This Love of Mine" (Frank Sinatra, Sol Parker, Henry W. Sanicola Jr.) - 6:45
 "Walkin' and Talkin'" (Bennie Green) - 8:57
 "All I Do Is Dream of You" (Nacio Herb Brown, Arthur Freed) - 5:33
 "Hoppin' Johns" - 5:26

Personnel
Bennie Green - trombone
Eddie Williams - tenor saxophone
Gildo Mahones - piano
George Tucker - bass
Al Dreares - drums

References 

Blue Note Records albums
Bennie Green albums
1959 albums
Albums recorded at Van Gelder Studio